Khasadan-e Sofla (also Romanized as Khasādān-e Soflá; also known as Khasādān-e Pā’īn and Khasāden-e Pā’īn) is a village in Machian Rural District, Kelachay District, Rudsar County, Gilan Province, Iran. At the 2006 census, its population was 163, in 36 families.

References 

Populated places in Rudsar County